Lazzat with Asad is a cooking show broadcast on the Metro One news television channel of Pakistan. The show also has an international audience. It has had over 1600 episodes. To improve the show the graphics are under-made. 
The word "Lazzat" is an Urdu word for taste, and the whole term "Lazzat with Asad" means "Taste with Asad".

Pakistani television series